Avelle Ntondele (born 30 August 1998) is a Congolese handball player for Étoile du Congo and the Congolese national team.

She represented Congo at the 2021 World Women's Handball Championship in Spain.

References

1998 births
Living people
Congolese female handball players